(Self-Titled) is the fifth full-length album by metalcore band Zao, released on February 21, 2001, by Solid State/Tooth & Nail/EMI. This album saw the departure of guitarist Russ Cogdell. The entire album was written in the recording studio by Scott and Jesse. Dan would be sent the tracks to write lyrics and then recorded them. The band famously broke up on stage (in Pennsylvania, Sept 2001) touring this album.

Track listing

Credits 
 Daniel Weyandt – vocals, percussion
 Scott Mellinger – composer, guitar, bass, percussion, producer
 Jesse Smith – drums, acoustic guitar, clean vocals, composer, bass guitar, keyboards, percussion, producer, programming
 Rob Horner – bass
 Production
 Russ Cogdell – composer
 Brian Gardner – mastering
 David Johnson – photography
 Jason Magnusson – engineer
 Barry Poynter – engineer, bass

Charts

References

Zao (American band) albums
2001 albums
Tooth & Nail Records albums
Solid State Records albums
EMI Records albums